There are a number of passages in the Hebrew Bible and the New Testament that have been interpreted as involving same-sex sexual activity and relationships. The passages about homosexual individuals and sexual relations in the Hebrew Bible are found primarily in the Torah (the first five books traditionally attributed to Moses). The book of Leviticus chapter 20 is more comprehensive on matters detestable sexual acts . Some texts included in the New Testament also reference homosexual individuals and sexual relations, such as the Gospel of Matthew, the Gospel of Luke, and various letters attributed to the Apostle Paul originally directed to the early Christian churches in Asia Minor. Both references in the Hebrew Bible and the New Testament have been interpreted as referring primarily to male homosexual individuals and sexual practices.

Hebrew Bible 

The Hebrew Bible/Old Testament and its traditional interpretations in Judaism and Christianity have historically affirmed and endorsed a patriarchal and heteronormative approach towards human sexuality, favouring exclusively penetrative vaginal intercourse between men and women within the boundaries of marriage over all other forms of human sexual activity, including autoeroticism, masturbation, oral sex, non-penetrative and non-heterosexual sexual intercourse (all of which have been labeled as "sodomy" at various times), believing and teaching that such behaviors are forbidden because they're considered sinful, and further compared to or derived from the behavior of the alleged residents of Sodom and Gomorrah.

Leviticus 18 and 20 

Chapters 18 and 20 of Leviticus form part of the Holiness code and list prohibited forms of intercourse, including the following verses:

"You shall not lie with a male as with a woman; it is an abomination." Chapter 18 verse 22
"If a man lies with a male as with a woman, both of them have committed an abomination; they shall surely be put to death; their blood is upon them." Chapter 20 verse 13

More recent interpretations focus on the passage's context as part of the Holiness Code, a code of purity meant to distinguish the behavior of the Israelites from the polytheistic Canaanites. 

Analyses by Saul Olyan, Professor of Religious Studies and Director of the Judaic Studies Program at Brown University, K. Renato Lings, and others focus on ambiguities embedded in the original Hebrew, arguing these ambiguities may not prohibit all erotic expression between men but rather proscribe incest between male family members. They argue English translators of Leviticus added to the original text to compensate for perceived lacunae in the biblical text; but thereby altered the verse's meaning. Leviticus 18:22 reads:

The New Revised Standard Version renders Leviticus 18:22 as "You shall not lie with a male as with a woman".

Lings argues the inclusion of prepositions not in the original text and the translation of Leviticus' otherwise unattested  within the context of Genesis (i.e.,  is found only within Leviticus 18:22 and 20:13, and Genesis 49:4) is crucial to illuminate the incestuous connotation of the passage, and the translation of miškevē in light of Genesis results in the text of Leviticus 18 and 20 becoming more cohesive.

Some authors alternatively suggest that the prohibitions in Leviticus 18 and 20 specifically condemn males penetrating other males, thus "emasculating" the latter (anal intercourse). This makes the prohibitions more akin to a sodomy law.

Sodom and Gomorrah 

The story of the destruction of Sodom and Gomorrah in Genesis does not explicitly identify homosexuality as the sin for which they were destroyed. Some interpreters find the story of Sodom and a similar one in Judges 19 to condemn the violent rape of guests more than homosexuality, but the passage has historically been interpreted within Judaism and Christianity as a punishment for homosexuality due to the interpretation that the men of Sodom wished to rape, or have sex with, the angels who retrieved Lot.

While the Jewish prophets spoke only of lack of charity as the sin of Sodom, the exclusively sexual interpretation became so prevalent among Christian communities that the name "Sodom" became the basis of the word "sodomy", still a legal synonym for homosexual and non-procreative sexual acts, particularly anal or oral sex.

While the Jewish prophets Isaiah, Jeremiah, Amos and Zephaniah refer vaguely to the sin of Sodom, Ezekiel specifies that the city was destroyed because of its commission of social injustice as well as its commission of "abomination:"

The Talmudic tradition as written between  also interprets the sin of Sodom as lack of charity, with the attempted rape of the angels being a manifestation of the city's violation of the social order of hospitality.

Later traditions on Sodom's sin, such as Testaments of the Twelve Patriarchs, considered it to be an illicit form of heterosexual intercourse. In Jude 1:7–8 the Bible says of Sodom and Gomorrha:

Even as Sodom and Gomorrha, and the cities about them in like manner, giving themselves over to fornication, and going after strange flesh, are set forth an example, suffering the vengeance of eternal fire. Likewise also these filthy dreamers defile the flesh..."

This has been interpreted as a reference to homosexuality by some and to the sexual lust of mortals after angels by others. Jewish writers Philo ( AD 50) and Josephus (37 –) were the first reported individuals to assert unambiguously that homosexuality was among the sins of Sodom. By the end of the 1st century AD, Jews commonly identified the sin of Sodom with homosexual practices.

David and Jonathan, Ruth and Naomi 

The account of David and Jonathan in the Books of Samuel has been interpreted by traditional and mainstream writers as a relationship of affectionate regard. It has also been interpreted by some authors as of a sexual nature. Theologian Theodore Jennings identifies the story as one of desire for David by both Saul and Jonathan, stating, "Saul's jealousy has driven [David] into Jonathan's arms." Michael Coogan, lecturer on the Old Testament at Harvard Divinity School, addresses the claim of the alleged homosexual relationship between David and Jonathan and explicitly rejects it.

The story of Ruth and Naomi is also occasionally interpreted by contemporary scholars as the story of a lesbian couple. Coogan states that the Hebrew Bible does not even mention lesbianism.

New Testament

Romans 1:26–27 
Romans 1:26–27 is commonly cited as one instance of New Testament teaching against homosexuality:

This passage, part of a larger discourse in 1:18–32, has been debated by contemporary Bible scholars as to its relevance today, what it actually prohibits and whether it represents Paul's view or rhetoric that Paul is actively arguing against. Clement of Alexandria and John Chrysostom regarded it as concerning female and male homosexual intercourse, while Augustine of Hippo viewed it as referring to heterosexual and homosexual anal sex. Although Christians of several denominations have historically maintained that this verse is a complete prohibition of all forms of homosexual activity, some 20th- and 21st-century authors contend the passage is not a blanket condemnation of homosexual acts, suggesting, among other interpretations, that the passage condemned heterosexuals who experimented with homosexual activity or that Paul's condemnation was relative to his own culture, in which homosexuality was not understood as an orientation and in which being penetrated was seen as shameful. These interpretations are, however, in a minority.

Scholars, noting that Romans 1:18–32 represents an exception in the book of Romans as a whole and uses vocabulary elsewhere not seen in Paul's letters, have for decades puzzled over the passage. Some scholars believe these verses are part of a much larger non-Pauline interpolation, a later addition to the letter. Others argue that the grammar of the Greek original demands that Romans 1:18–32 be read as a rhetorical set-up, a summary of Hellenistic Jewish legalist rhetoric that Paul actively forbids followers of Christ from using in Romans 2.

1 Corinthians 6:9–11; 1 Timothy 1:8–11 
In the context of the broader immorality of his audience, Paul the Apostle wrote in the First Epistle to the Corinthians, chapter 6 verses 9-11:

1 Timothy 1:8–11 states:

 is a compound word. Compound words are formed when two or more words are put together to form a new word with a new meaning. In this case,  is from the Greek words / meaning "male", and  meaning "bed", with a sexual connotation. A direct translation would be "male-bed". Its first recorded use was by Paul in 1 Corinthians and later in 1 Timothy 1 (attributed to Paul), and remains unattested in contemporaneous sources. It has been variously rendered as "sexual perverts", "sodomites", "abusers of themselves with mankind", "men who have sex with men" or "practicing homosexuals".

 ("softness", "weakliness") is an ancient Greek word that, in relation to men, has sometimes been translated as "effeminacy". Also translates to "of things subject to touch, "soft" (used in Matthew 11:8 and Luke 7:25 to describe a garment); of things not subject to touch, "gentle"; and, of persons or modes of life, a number of meanings that include "pathic". However, in modern Greek it has come to mean "masturbation", and its derivative  –  means "one who masturbates".

Interpretation

Bishop Gene Robinson says the early church seemed to have understood it as a person with a "soft" or weak morality; later, it would come to denote (and be translated as) those who engage in masturbation, or "those who abuse themselves"; all that is factually known about the word is that it means "soft".

Most scholars hold that Paul had two passages of the Book of Leviticus – Leviticus 18:22 and Leviticus 20:13 – in mind when he used the word  (which may be of his coinage), with most commentators and translators interpreting it as a reference to male same-sex intercourse. However, John Boswell states that it "did not connote homosexuality to Paul or his early readers", and that in later Christian literature the word is used, for instance, by Aristides of Athens clearly not for homosexuality and possibly for prostitution, Eusebius who evidently used it in reference to women, and in the writings of 6th-century Patriarch John IV of Constantinople, known as John the Faster. Although the constituent elements of the compound word refer to sleeping with men, he obviously does not use it to mean homosexual intercourse and appears to employ it for anal intercourse, not generic homosexual activity. Particulars of Boswell's arguments are rejected by several scholars in a way qualified as persuasive by David F. Greenberg, who declares usage of the term  by writers such as Aristides of Athens and Eusebius, and in the Sibylline Oracles, to be "consistent with a homosexual meaning". A discussion document issued by the House of Bishops of the Church of England states that most scholars still hold that the word  relates to homosexuality. Another work attributed to John the Faster, a series of canons that for various sins provided shorter though stricter penances in place of the previous longer penances, applies a penance of 80 days for "intercourse of men with one another" (canon 9), explained in the Pedalion as mutual masturbation – double the penalty for solitary masturbation (canon 8) – and three years with xerophagy or, in accordance with the older canon of Basil the Great, 15 without (canon 18) for being "so mad as to copulate with another man" –  in the original – explained in the Pedalion as "guilty of arsenocoetia (i.e., sexual intercourse between males)" –  in the original. According to the same work, ordination is not to be conferred on someone who as a boy has been the victim of anal intercourse, but this is not the case if the semen was ejaculated between his thighs (canon 19). These canons are included, with commentary, in the Pedalion, the most widely used collection of canons of the Greek Orthodox Church, an English translation of which was produced by Denver Cummings and published by the Orthodox Christian Educational Society in 1957 under the title The Rudder.

Some scholars consider that the term was not used to refer to a homosexual orientation, but argue that it referred instead to sexual activity.

Jesus's discussion of marriage 
In Matthew 19 and parallel in Mark 10, Jesus is asked if a man can divorce his wife. In that context, Jesus replies:

Theologian Robert A. J. Gagnon argues that Jesus's back-to-back references to Genesis 1 and Genesis 2 show that he "presupposed a two-sex requirement for marriage". On the other hand, Bart Ehrman, Professor of Religious Studies at the University of North Carolina, states of Jesus's references to Genesis 1 and 2, "[Jesus is] not actually defining marriage. He's answering a specific question." Ehrman notes further "And here the conversation is quite easy. In our surviving records Jesus says nothing about same-sex acts or sexual orientation. Nothing. Nada."

Matthew 8; Luke 7 

In Matthew 8:5–13 and Luke 7:1–10, Jesus heals a centurion's servant who is dying. Daniel A. Helminiak writes that the Greek word , used in this account to refer to the servant, was sometimes given a sexual meaning. Donald Wold states that its normal meaning is "boy", "child" or "slave" and its application to a boy lover escapes notice in the standard lexica of Liddell and Scott and Bauer. The Greek-English Lexicon of Liddell and Scott registers three meanings of the word : a child in relation to descent (son or daughter); a child in relation to age (boy or girl); a slave or servant (male or female). In her detailed study of the episode in Matthew and Luke, Wendy Cotter dismisses as very unlikely the idea that the use of the Greek word  indicated a sexual relationship between the centurion and the young slave.

Matthew's account has parallels in Luke 7:1–10 and John 4:46–53. There are major differences between John's account and those of the two synoptic writers, but such differences exist also between the two synoptic accounts, with next to nothing of the details in Luke 7:2–6 being present also in Matthew. Writers who admit John 4:46–53 as a parallel passage generally interpret Matthew's  as "child" or "boy", while those who exclude it see it as meaning "servant" or "slave".

D.B. Saddington writes that, while he does not exclude the possibility, the evidence the two put forward supports "neither of these interpretations", with Wendy Cotter saying that they fail to take account of Jewish condemnation of pederasty.

Matthew 19:12 
In Matthew 19:12, Jesus speaks of eunuchs who were born as such, eunuchs who were made so by others, and eunuchs who choose to live as such for the kingdom of heaven. Jesus's reference to eunuchs who were born as such has been interpreted by some commentators as having to do with homosexual orientation; Clement of Alexandria, for instance, cites in his book "Stromata" (chapter III,1,1) an earlier interpretation from Basilides that some men, from birth, are naturally averse to women and should not marry. Catholic priest John J. McNeill writes, "The first category – those eunuchs who have been so from birth – is the closest description we have in the Bible of what we understand today as homosexual."

Acts 8 

The Ethiopian eunuch, an early Gentile convert described in Acts 8, has been interpreted by some commentators as an early gay Christian, based on the fact that the word "eunuch" in the Bible was not always used literally, as in Matthew 19:12. Some religious commentators suggest that the combination of "eunuch" together with the title "court official" indicates a literal eunuch who would have been excluded from the Temple by the restriction in Deuteronomy 23:1.

See also 

 Abomination (Judaism)
 Biblical law
 Christianity and homosexuality
 Homosexuality and Judaism
 Homosexuality and religion
 Homosexuality in ancient Greece
 Malakia
 Sexuality of Jesus
 Women in Christianity

Notes

References

Bibliography 

 
 Amsel, Nachum. Homosexuality in Orthodox Judaism .
 Boswell, John. 1980 Christianity, Social Tolerance and Homosexuality. University of Chicago Press. 
 
 
 
 Brooten, Bernadette. 1998 Love Between Women: Early Christian Responses to Female Homoeroticism University of Chicago Press. 
 Brown, Driver, Briggs and Gesenius. Hebrew Lexicon entry for Dabaq. The Old Testament Hebrew Lexicon.
 Brunson, Hal. 2007 Lesbos, Narcissus, and Paulos: Homosexual Myth and Christian Truth.  
 
 
 Crompton, Louis, et al. 2003 Homosexuality and Civilization. The Belknap Press of Harvard University Press 
 
 
 
Elliott, John H. 2004 "No kingdom of God for softies? or, what was Paul really saying? 1 Corinthians 6:9–10 in context'" Biblical Theology Bulletin, Spring 2004.
 Gagnon, Robert A. J. 2001 The Bible and Homosexual Practice. Abingdon Press. 
Greenberg, David F. 1988 The construction of homosexuality. University of Chicago Press. 
Halsall, Paul. Homosexuality and Catholicism: A Partially Annotated Bibliography
Helminiak, Daniel 2000 What the Bible really says about homosexuality. Alamo Square Press. 
Horner, Tom. 1978 Jonathan Loved David. Westminster Press. 
House of Bishops 1991 Issues in Human Sexuality. Church of England. 
 Jennings, Theodore 2003 The Man Jesus Loved: Homoerotic Narratives From the New Testament. Pilgrim Press. 
Johns, Loren 2004 "Homosexuality and the Bible: A Case Study in the Use of the Bible for Ethics"  Associated Mennonite Biblical Seminary.
Koch, Timothy R 2001 "Cruising as methodology: homoeroticism and the scriptures", in Queer Commentary and the Hebrew Bible, Ken Stone, ed. Pilgrim Press. 
Martin, Dale. 1996 "Arsenokoites and malakos: Meanings and Consequences", pp. 117–136. in Biblical Ethics and Homosexuality. Robert Brawley, ed. Westminster Press .
McNeill, J. J. 1993 The Church and the Homosexual. Beacon Press. (4th edn.). 
 
Nissinen, Martti. 1998 Homoeroticism in the Biblical World: A Historical Perspective. Augsburg Fortress Publishers. 
Ostling, R. N. 2003 Book claims Jesus had homosexual relationship Chicago Sun-Times 29 May 2003.
Robinson, B. A. 1996–2005 What the Bible says about homosexuality. Ontario Consultants on Religious Tolerance.
 Robinson, Gene. 2012 God Believes in Love. Straight talk about gay marriage. Vintage Press. 
Satlow, Michael 1995 Tasting the Dish: Rabbinic Rhetorics of Sexuality. Scholars Press. 
 
Townsley, Jeramy 2003 All known references to arsenokoit*
  Also available online
 Williams, Rowan 2002 'The Body's Grace', in Eugene F. Rogers (ed.), Theology and Sexuality: Classic and Contemporary Readings, Blackwell. 

LGBT and Judaism
Judaism-related controversies
Homosex
Religious law
LGBT and Christianity
Homosexuality
Homosexuality
Homosexuality-related mass media